Walter Raleigh Kibbe (Sept. 8, 1781-April 22, 1864) was an American lawyer, judge, and politician.

He was born in Somers, Connecticut, Sept. 8, 1781. He graduated from Yale College in 1804. He was a lawyer by profession, having been admitted to the bar in 1807. He represented his native place in the Connecticut Legislature during the years 1828, '29, '31, '34, and '38, and in 1832 was a State Senator from the 20th district. He held the office of Judge of Probate during a period of ten years, and was Postmaster from 1821 to 1828 In the latter year, he was one of the Presidential Electors. In the public and private relations of life he maintained a reputation for uprightness and independence. His devotion to the study of the Bible is said to have been remarkable, especially in the later years of his life.

He died in Somers, Conn., April 22, 1864, aged 82 years. Three of his six children survived him.

1781 births
1864 deaths
People from Somers, Connecticut
Connecticut state senators
Members of the Connecticut House of Representatives
Yale College alumni
19th-century American politicians
1828 United States presidential electors